The city of Sydney, Australia, is home to some of the finest and most famous beaches in the world. There are well over 100 beaches in the city, ranging in size from a few metres to several kilometres, located along the city's Pacific Ocean coastline and its harbours, bays and rivers.

With around 70 surf beaches and dozens of harbour coves, Sydney is almost unrivalled in the world for the number and quality of beaches available. The water and sand among the city beaches, despite their popularity, are remarkably clean. The beach watch program was established in 1989 in response to community concern about the impact of sewage pollution on human health and the environment at Sydney's ocean beaches.

Ocean beaches
Sydney's ocean beaches include the internationally renowned Bondi, Coogee, Cronulla and Manly. The ocean beaches are usually divided into the Northern Beaches, located north of the entrance to Sydney Harbour and the southern beaches which are in the Eastern Suburbs and Sutherland Shire area. Most beach suburbs have one beach but some have more. Manly has eight beaches that range from the large 1.6 km Ocean Beach to the tiny Fairy Bower Beach.

From north to south, Sydney's ocean beaches are:

Northern
Avalon
Bilgola
Bungan
Collaroy
Curl Curl
Dee Why
Fairy Bower
Fishermans
Freshwater
Long Reef
Manly
Mona Vale
Narrabeen
Newport
North Curl Curl
North Narrabeen
North Steyne
Palm Beach
Queenscliff
Shelly Beach (Manly)
Turimetta
Warriewood
Whale Beach
Southern
Bondi
Bronte
Clovelly
Coogee
Cronulla
Elouera
 Gordons Bay
Little Bay
Malabar
Maroubra
North Cronulla
Phillip Bay
Shelly Beach (Cronulla)
Tamarama
Wanda
When conditions are suitable, a sandy beach forms, in what is normally a rocky inlet, at Mackenzies Bay.

Sydney Harbour
Beaches in Port Jackson include:
Balmoral Beach
Clontarf
Little Manly Beach
North Head Quarantine Station Beach
Lady Martins Beach
Seven Shillings Beach, Point Piper
Double Bay Beach
Camp Cove
Shark Beach
Milk Beach, Vaucluse
Chowder Bay, Clifton Gardens
Chinamans Beach, The Spit
Washaway Beach
Obelisk Beach
Cobblers Beach
Athol Bay Beach, Clifton Gardens
Edwards Beach
Reef Beach
Castle Rock

Botany Bay
Beaches in Botany Bay include:
 Bumbora Rock at the north end of Yarra Bay
 Congwong Beach
 Cooks River to the west of the airport
 Foreshore Beach
 Frenchmans Bay in La Perouse
 Elephants Trunk
 Lady Robinsons Beach (which includes Brighton Beach, Ramsgate beach and Dolls Point Beach, among others), is known to have the most whitest sand in Sydney
 Little Congwong Beach
 Pelican Point
 Penrhyn Beach (possibly now part of the container terminals)
 Silver Beach
 Towra Beach
 Taren Spit Beach
 Yarra Bay

There are also more beaches along the Hawkesbury River to the north, and Botany Bay and Port Hacking to the south.

See also
 List of beaches in Australia

References

Guide to Sydney Beaches
"Sand in our Souls - the Beach in Australian History" Leone Huntsman, MUP, 2001
 Beachsafe

Geography of Sydney
Beaches of Sydney
Sydney
Beaches